Bentley is an area in the Metropolitan Borough of Walsall located around Junction 10 of the M6 Motorway. It is also a rural village of houses towards its eastern sides. It shares borders with the areas of Willenhall, Beechdale, Ashmore Park, Pleck, Darlaston and Alumwell.

History 
Bentley is noted for its involvement in the English Civil War, when in 1651, after the Battle of Worcester, King Charles II took shelter with the Lane Family in Bentley Hall while attempting to escape to exile.  Jane Lane famously helped the King escape by disguising him as her servant, and riding with him to Somerset.  Bentley Cairn marks the location of Bentley Hall upon the hill. The Cairn has recently undergone improvements, carried out by the Bentley Cairn Restoration Group.

In addition to these improvements, the remains of another manor house near the Cairn were discovered during May 2006, and an archaeological survey will take place by the Bentley Cairn Restoration Group, funded by the Darlaston Local Neighbourhood Partnership, in order to confirm and restore the remains of the house.

Bentley was originally developed between the late 1940s and early 1960s, where new local authority housing was built as part of the post Second World War housing construction boom, when it came within the borders of Darlaston Urban District Council; this now-defunct authority built several hundred homes at the north side of the Walsall to Wolverhampton road. Most of the roads on the estate took their name from Second World War heroes or from members of the British Royal Family. Further development took place from the late 1970s to the early 1980s with construction of the Old Hall estate, a development of several hundred local authority houses and apartments.

Local points of interest 
Bentley is locally well known for its points of interest. They include Bentley Cairn, Emmanuel Church (denomination: Church of England), the ABC park, the lake and the dis-used railway line which runs through Bentley from Walsall and into Willenhall.

More recently Bentley has become well known because of its proximity to the M6 motorway, a multi-screen cinema, casino, and a variety of restaurants.

Public transport
Several bus routes serve Bentley, linking it to Bilston, Darlaston, New Invention, Walsall, Willenhall and Wolverhampton. These services are operated by National Express West Midlands and Travel Express.

There was a proposed expansion on West Midlands Metro linking Walsall, Beechdale, Bentley, Willenhall, Wednesfield, New Cross Hospital and Wolverhampton.  This has since been ruled out due to "lack of local support" for the move and have shifted focus to reopening train stations in Willenhall and Darlaston

There was a station around half a mile east of Bentley near Bloxwich Lane which served Bentley  until its closure in 1898 although the line from Walsall to Wolverhampton continued to be used by freight and goods traffic until 1960s when the section from North Walsall to Willenhall was closed. The station is now under the M6 motorway near junction 10. Although inaccessible, one can make out where the embankment was should they try to pinpoint the location near Bloxwich Lane and the motorway.

Education
Bentley has one Secondary School and several primary schools. These are:
 County Bridge Primary 
 Bentley West Primary
 King Charles Primary
 Lodge Farm Primary 
 Willenhall School Sports College (Lodge Farm and WSSC are officially in Willenhall, but have an entrance from Bentley)
Additionally, Jane Lane Special School is located in Bentley.

Bibliography

Gardiner, S. R. (1903). History of the Commonwealth and Protectorate, 1649-1656. London: Longmans.

References

Walsall